Venables is an English surname of Norman–French origin, derived from the town of the same name in Normandy and introduced to England by way of the Norman conquest.

People
 Anthony Venables (born 1953), English economist
 Brent Venables (born 1970), American college football coach
 Clare Venables (1943–2003), British theatre director
Dione Venables (born 1930), British publisher and author
 Archbishop Gregory James Venables (born 1949), British religious leader -- Primate of the Southern Cone
 Jon Venables (born 1982), British murderer of James Bulger
 Philip Venables (born 1979), British composer
 Raissa Venables (born 1977), American photographer
 Robert Venables (c. 1613–1687), English soldier & writer
 Terry Venables (born 1943), British football manager
 Stephen Venables (born 1954), British mountaineer and writer

Places
 Venables, village in France

See also
 Venable

English-language surnames